Franklin Kroonenberg (born 11 March 1961), known professionally as Franklin Brown, is a Dutch singer and voice actor. He is known for representing the Netherlands in the Eurovision Song Contest 1996, together with Maxine, with the song "De eerste keer".

Career

Eurovision Song Contest 1996 
In 1996, Franklin Brown and Maxine won the Nationaal Songfestival with the song "De eerste keer". This gave them the right to represent the Netherlands in the Eurovision Song Contest 1996, held in Oslo, Norway. They finished in seventh place with 78 points.

After Eurovision 
After the contest, Maxine and Franklin Brown continued to pursue their own solo careers, only to get back together in 2005, when Brown founded the supergroup The EuroStars. Apart from Maxine and Franklin Brown, this group consists of the Dutch Eurovision representatives Mandy Huydts (of Frizzle Sizzle, 1986), Marlayne (1999) and Esther Hart (2003).

In 2020, Brown participated in a special Eurovision-themed broadcast of the Dutch television programme Beste Zangers, in which he performed the song "One Good Reason" by Marlayne.

Criminal charges 
In the 1980s and 1990s, Brown worked as a police officer in Rotterdam. After several female colleagues had accused him of sexual assault, he was fired and received a two-month suspended prison sentence. One of these colleagues, who had sent him sexually explicit e-mails, was later also fired because she had made a false accusation.

Discography

With Maxine 

 "De eerste keer" (1996)
 "Steeds weer" (2007)
 "Balsem voor het hart" (2012)

With The EuroStars 

 "Love Shine a Light" (2010)

As solo artist 

 "Me Again" (2011)
 "Keep Your Eye on the Sparrow" (2011)
 "One Good Reason" (2020)

Filmography 

Frozen II (2019) – Mattias (Dutch voice)

References 

1961 births
Living people
Musicians from Rotterdam
Dutch male singers
Eurovision Song Contest entrants for the Netherlands
Eurovision Song Contest entrants of 1996
Dutch male voice actors
Nationaal Songfestival contestants
Actors from Rotterdam